Mohal Khera or Mohalkhera is a village in Narwana tehsil in Jind district in the Indian state of Haryana.

References

Villages in Jind district